Mariana Betsa  (born 1 January 1978) is a Ukrainian diplomat. MFA of Ukraine Spokesperson. Ambassador Extraordinary and Plenipotentiary of Ukraine.

Early life and education 
She was born in Kyiv, on 1 January 1978. Betsa graduated from Taras Shevchenko National University of Kyiv in 1999. She holds a PhD in International Law, and is an English translator.

Professional career and experience 
At the diplomatic service in the Ministry of Foreign Affairs since 2001. In 2001-2005 and 2009-2012 Mariana worked at diplomatic positions in the Contracting-Law Department of the Ministry of Foreign Affairs of Ukraine.

Betsa worked twice abroad: from 2005 to 2009 - at the Embassy of Ukraine in the Kingdom of the Netherlands, and from 2012 to June 2015 - at the Permanent Mission of Ukraine to the international organizations in Vienna (OSCE issue).

During her time at the Foreign Ministry, she was trained at the University of Westminster, the Clingendhal Institute of International Relations (The Hague, Netherlands) and the Ministry of Foreign Affairs of the Republic of Indonesia.

Mariana is a specialist on international law, human rights and the OSCE.

From 13 September 2018 - Ambassador Extraordinary and Plenipotentiary of Ukraine to Estonia.

References

External links 
 Embassy of Ukraine in the Republic of Estonia
 Interview of Spokesperson for the MFA of Ukraine Mariana Betsa at Ukrainian state foreign language broadcaster UATV.
 Mariana Betsa: US fully supports territorial integrity of Ukraine
 The United States and the European Union at a meeting of the OSCE Ministerial Council in Vienna expressed strong support for the territorial integrity and sovereignty of Ukraine and stated they would never recognize the annexation of Crimea by Russia
 Ukraine’s MFA Representative Mariana Betsa Caught out in Massive Lie

1978 births
Living people
Diplomats from Kyiv
Taras Shevchenko National University of Kyiv alumni
Ambassadors of Ukraine to Estonia
Ukrainian jurists
Ukrainian women ambassadors